The 2018–19 Welsh Football League Division One (known as the Nathaniel Cars Welsh Football League Division One for sponsorship reasons) was the 2018–19 season of the top football league in South Wales. The champions at the end of the season were Penybont.

Together with its North Wales counterpart, the Cymru Alliance, the 16-team division formed the second tier of the Welsh football league system, one level below the nationwide Welsh Premier League. The season began on 10 August 2018 and concluded in April 2019.

This was the last season as the 'Welsh League Division One' at Tier 2 with FAW Championship South & Mid instead being this level from the 2019–20 season. The First Division will instead be at Tier 3 level for the 2019–20 season.

Teams

Llanelli Town were champions in the previous season and were promoted to the 2018–19 Welsh Premier League.  There was no relegation from the Premier League to Division One.

Monmouth Town and Caerau (Ely) were relegated and replaced by the promoted teams from 2017-18 Welsh Football League Division Two.  They were Llantwit Major, Pontypridd Town and Ammanford.

Stadia and locations

League table

Results

References

External links

2018–19 in Welsh football
Welsh Football League Division One seasons